Empis geneatis is a species of dance flies in the family Empididae.

References

Empis
Articles created by Qbugbot
Insects described in 1902